Venha-Ver (lit. "come see") is the westernmost city in the Brazilian state of Rio Grande do Norte. The city's name means "Come-to-see-it" in Portuguese. The highest point of the state is located there, in the Serra do Coqueiro mountain range, at the triple border of Rio Grande do Norte, Paraíba and Ceará.

References 

Municipalities in Rio Grande do Norte
Populated places established in 1992